Gunnlaugur Halldórsson (1909–1986) was an Icelandic architect. He is considered the first Icelandic modernist architect. He was educated in Denmark.

Some of his notable works include the controversial 1940 expansion of Landsbankinn, Háskólabíó(co-designed by Guðmundur Kr. Kristinsson) and the re-designed of Bessastaðir(the official residence of the President of Iceland) in the style of Danish manors. He designed the Sólheimar tower blocks in Reykjavík; the first of their kind.

References

1909 births
1986 deaths
Gunnlaugur Halldorsson